Jorasanko Thakur Bari (Bengali: House of the Thakurs; anglicised to Tagore) in Jorasanko,  North Kolkata, West Bengal, India, is the ancestral home of the Tagore family. It is the birthplace of poet Rabindranath Tagore and the host of the Rabindra Bharati University campus.

History
Jorasanko Thakur Bari was built in the 18th century on the land donated by the Sett family of Burrabazar to ‘Prince’ Dwarkanath Tagore.

Rabindra Bharati University
The Rabindra Bharati University was established by the government of West Bengal in 1961 to commemorate the birth centenary of Rabindranath Tagore.

Rabindra Bharati Museum
The house has been restored to reflect the way the household looked when the Tagore family lived in it and currently serves as the Tagore museum, offering details about the history of the Tagore family including their involvement in the Bengal Renaissance and the Brahmo Samaj. Photography is strictly prohibited inside the museum, but allowed in outside. There is a light and sound show also, which happens in evening.

Visits and programmes

The Rabindra Bharati University organizes regular cultural programmes on Tagore's birthday, Panchise Baisakh, when thousands flock to Jorasanko Thakur Bari, and on other occasions, such as his death anniversary, Baishe Shravan. It also organises a festival of arts, Aban Mela.

Gallery

See also
 Tagore Memorial Museum, at Shilaidaha Kuthibadi, Shilaidaha, Bangladesh
 Santiniketan

References

External links

 Rabindra Bharati University Website
 Tagore family museum website
 PIB Press Release on Film Awards - The award for the Best Direction for the Year 2001 was given to Buddhadeb Dasgupta for the film Jorasanko Thakurbari for artistically unfolding the history of the house of the Tagores.

Buildings and structures in Kolkata
Museums in West Bengal
Houses in India
Tourist attractions in Kolkata
Tagore family
Historic house museums in India
Memorials to Rabindranath Tagore